Akeem Raphael Jordan (born August 17, 1985) is a former American football and Canadian football linebacker. He was signed by the Philadelphia Eagles as an undrafted free agent in 2007. He has also played for the Kansas City Chiefs and Washington Redskins. He played college football at James Madison.

Early years
Jordan attended Harrisonburg High School in Virginia. While there, he played high school football. In 2001, he was named the Virginia Group AA Player of the Year after leading his team to a state title. He earned first-team all-state honors in 2002 as a senior defensive back, and second-team honors as a running back.

College career
Jordan played college football at James Madison University, where he was a member of the 2004 National Championship team which defeated The University of Montana to win the title. He was named the Colonial Athletic Association Football Conference Defensive Player of the Year in 2006 after posting 140 tackles including 17 tackles for a loss, 5.5 sacks, one forced fumble, and one fumble recovery. He finished third in voting for the 2006 Dudley Award, which is given annually to the best college football player in Virginia, behind Vince Hall and Chris Long. Jordan was named to the American Football Coaches Association Division I-AA Coaches' All-America Team in 2006. He finished second in voting for the Buck Buchanan Award, which is given to the best defensive player in Division I FCS. He was named the Virginia Defensive Player of the Year following the season as well. In his career as a Duke, he appeared in 50 games (26 starts) and made 299 tackles and 7.5 sacks. He graduated from James Madison in 2007.

Professional career

Philadelphia Eagles

Signed as an undrafted free agent by the Philadelphia Eagles in 2007, Jordan played in all preseason games and led the team in tackles when the preseason was over. He made the final cuts when the Eagles had to come down to the 53-man roster, but was cut and signed to the practice squad the next day when the Eagles picked up two free agents. On October 29, 2007, the Eagles cut linebacker Matt McCoy and called up Jordan from the practice squad. He made his NFL debut later that week, playing special teams against the Dallas Cowboys. Jordan made his first NFL start in week 17 of the 2007 season at weakside linebacker against the Buffalo Bills after Takeo Spikes was placed on injured reserve. He recorded 14 tackles in the game. He played in nine games as a rookie and finished fourth in special teams productions.

Jordan began the 2008 season as the backup weakside linebacker to Omar Gaither, playing mostly on special teams. In a week 12 game against the Baltimore Ravens, Jordan replaced Gaither at weakside linebacker. Jordan led the team with nine tackles in the game. He kept the starting weakside linebacker job for the remainder of the season. The next week against the Arizona Cardinals on Thanksgiving night, Jordan recovered his first career fumble. He recorded 10 tackles in a week 16 loss to the Washington Redskins.

Jordan beat out Gaither for the starting right outside linebacker job before the 2009 season. Jordan made an interception in each of the first two weeks of the season. He missed four straight games after suffering a hyperextended knee in a week 9 game against the Dallas Cowboys. He rotated with Jeremiah Trotter at middle linebacker upon his return. Jordan made two starts at middle linebacker. Jordan finished the season with 82 tackles in ten starts.

Jordan was re-signed to a one-year restricted free agent tender on March 22, 2010. He beat out Moise Fokou for the starting strongside linebacker job in the preseason, but was replaced by Fokou after starting the first four games of the season.

Jordan was not offered a tender following the 2010 season. He was re-signed to a one-year contract on July 30, 2011. He was re-signed again to a two-year contract on September 6.

Kansas City Chiefs
Jordan agreed to terms on a one-year deal with the Kansas City Chiefs on April 13, 2013, reuniting him with former head coach Andy Reid.

Washington Redskins
Jordan signed with the Washington Redskins on March 19, 2014. He was placed on the active roster on October 18, 2014. On November 25, the Redskins waived him off their injured reserve.

Toronto Argonauts
On September 12, 2017, Jordan signed with the Toronto Argonauts of the Canadian Football League. Jordan made his debut on October 7, 2017 against the Saskatchewan Roughriders and made 10 tackles. Jordan played in 4 games in 2017, and played in 15 games in 2018. After receiving an extension prior to free agency opening, Jordan was released following the 2019 preseason. In 19 regular season games with the Argos, Jordan produced 41 tackles, 9 special teams tackles, and a forced fumble.

Personal life
Jordan and two of his James Madison teammates were charged with assault and battery by a teammate in February 2006. The teammate dropped the charges on March 20, 2006, but gave no reason for doing so. Jordan was arrested and served with a citizen-obtained warrant for misdemeanor assault and battery in Harrisonburg, Virginia, on June 19, 2011.

References

External links

Toronto Argonauts bio
Kansas City Chiefs bio
James Madison Dukes bio

1985 births
Living people
People from Harrisonburg, Virginia
Players of American football from Virginia
American football linebackers
Canadian football linebackers
American players of Canadian football
James Madison Dukes football players
Philadelphia Eagles players
Kansas City Chiefs players
Washington Redskins players
Toronto Argonauts players